Jessica Kate Meyer is an American retired actress, who has appeared in The Pianist, and was later ordained as a rabbi.

Films
The Pianist as Halina Szpilman (2002)
Al sur de Granada as Dora Carrington (2003)
Rise of the Damned as Kellie (2011)

Television
Scrubs (2004)
Mrs. Harris (2005)

References

American actresses
American rabbis
Living people
Year of birth missing (living people)
21st-century American Jews
21st-century American women